Karakar Tunnel is an under-construction 2 km long tunnel connecting Buner to Swat District. The tunnel will shortcut the 11 km long distance of Karakar Pass to 3 km.

References

Tunnels in Pakistan
Road tunnels in Pakistan
Buner District
Swat District